The men's doubles squash event of the 2011 Pan American Games will be held from October 15–16 at the Squash Complex in Guadalajara.

Draw

References

Squash at the 2011 Pan American Games